Kevin Daley (born August 10, 1957) is an American politician in the state of Michigan. He currently serves in the Michigan Senate for the 26th district. He previously represented the 31st district. He served in the Michigan House of Representatives from January 1, 2009 until January 1, 2015. One of the few farmers in the House, he was the chairman of the House Agriculture Committee.

Daley has served in various roles in community organizations and affiliations, including as the president of the Tri-County Michigan Milk Producers Association and board member of the Lapeer County Farm Bureau. Immediately prior to his election to the House of Representatives, Daley served 24 years as trustee, treasurer and supervisor of Arcadia Township. Daley is a former member of the Lapeer County Agriculture Preservation Board, and a current member of Michigan Right to Life and the National Rifle Association.

Electoral history

2008

2010

2012

References

Living people
Republican Party members of the Michigan House of Representatives
Republican Party Michigan state senators
1957 births
Place of birth missing (living people)
People from Lapeer County, Michigan
21st-century American politicians